Barry Parkin (born: 1 April 1964) is a sailor from Leeds, Great Britain. who represented his country at the 1996 Summer Olympics in Savannah, United States as crew member in the Soling. With helmsman Andy Beadsworth and fellow crew member Adrian Stead they took the 4th place. During the 2000 Summer Olympics in Sydney, Australia Barry took 12th place in the Soling with helmsman Andy Beadsworth and fellow crewmember Richard Sydenham.

References

Living people
1964 births
Sailors at the 1996 Summer Olympics – Soling
Sailors at the 2000 Summer Olympics – Soling
Olympic sailors of Great Britain
Sportspeople from Leeds
British male sailors (sport)